Puente San Miguel (Spain) (formerly known as Bárcena la Puente), is the capital of the municipality of Reocín in Cantabria, Spain, and its most important population center, with 15,000 inhabitants (2010).

It is located 55 kilometers from Santander and is 41 meters (ASL). It is connected to Santander by the Feve company railway.

Notable people
Birthplace of golfer, Celia Barquín Arozamena (1996–2018).
Birthplace of rally driver, Dani Sordo (born 1983)

Populated places in Cantabria